Holme Valley is a large civil parish in the Metropolitan Borough of Kirklees in West Yorkshire, England.  It has a population of 25,049 (2001 census), increasing to 34,680 for the two wards in the 2011 Census.   Its administrative centre is in Holmfirth. Other sizeable settlements in the parish include, Brockholes, Honley and New Mill.  It is named from the River Holme that runs through the parish.

.

The parish is the successor to the Holmfirth urban district.  An urban district covering Holmfirth was created in 1894 by the Local Government Act 1894 and then in 1938, under a County Review Order, absorbed parts of the Holme, Honley, New Mill, South Crosland and Thurstonland and Farnley Tyas urban districts, keeping the name.  Under the Local Government Act 1972, the Holmfirth urban district was abolished on 1 April 1974, but its area was retained as a single civil parish with a parish council. The council changed its name from Holmfirth Parish Council to its present Holme Valley Parish Council in 1975.

.

See also
Holme Valley Mountain Rescue Team

References

https://web.archive.org/web/20070930230157/http://www.visionofbritain.org.uk/relationships.jsp?u_id=10097502&c_id=10001043

External links

Holme Valley Official parish council website
Map of Parish Wards and Polling districts
Kirklees Council website - Holme Valley Parish Council

 
Geography of Kirklees
Civil parishes in West Yorkshire